The Procession of Queens (Croatian: Godišnji proljetni ophod kraljice or Ljelje) is a yearly spring ritual performed in the village of Gorjani located in the Slavonia region of Croatia.

See also
Intangible cultural heritage

References

External links
Spring procession of Ljelje/Kraljice

Annual events in Croatia
Croatian culture
Masterpieces of the Oral and Intangible Heritage of Humanity
Slavonia